Carl Lindner may refer to:

 Carl Lindner Jr. (1919–2011), American businessman from Cincinnati
 Carl Lindner III (born 1953), son of Carl Lindner Jr. and American businessman from Cincinnati